Sir Ian Isaac Stoutzker CBE is a British banker, musician and philanthropist.  He was born in England in 1929. Sir Ian was born into a musical family. His father was the Cantor at the Central Synagogue in London and his mother, Dora Cohen, a piano teacher in Tredegar, South Wales.

Education
 Berkhamsted School
 Royal College of Music
 London School of Economics

Citation
The Royal Academy of Music’s citation for its award of Honorary Fellowship to Ian Stoutzker in 2008 stated, “With the possible exception of George Frederic Handel, no individual has done more to bring music to children and the disadvantaged in the history of this country than Ian Stoutzker”

Royal College of Music
Ian studied the violin with the great English violinist Albert Sammons at the Royal College of Music. He might have become a professional musician himself but chose to work in commerce to support his devotion to music. He became a member of the Council of the Royal College in 1968 and served for thirty one years. On retirement in 1999 he was made a Vice President of the College.

Notable musical involvements
New Philharmonia/Philharmonia Orchestra

Following the death of Otto Klemperer in 1973, the New Philharmonia Orchestra needed financial support and new musical leadership. The orchestra was successful in meeting both of these needs. The financial support was provided when for the first time a non-playing member of a London orchestra was appointed Chairman. Ian was in a position to give financial support but he was also a serious musician with wide contacts able to provide leadership during this difficult period. 
At this time Ricardo Muti was appointed Principal Conductor and Lorin Maazel, Principal Guest Conductor. Many young outstanding instrumentalists applied to join the orchestra: leader, Carl Pini, principal viola, Csaba Erdélyi - the only viola player ever to win the Carl Flesch Competition - Gordon Hunt, oboe, Pat Lyndon, flute, Michael Thompson, horn and John Wallace, trumpet. Once again the Orchestra became at the forefront of musical excellence, many thought this was a golden period.
Ian is rightly credited with rescuing the finances of the Orchestra at a hazardous moment in its history. He also proposed and oversaw the complicated legal issues of restoring its name from the ‘New Philharmonia Orchestra’ to the original name of the ‘Philharmonia Orchestra’.  He held the appointment as Chairman from 1973-1976 and was President of the Orchestra from 1976 to 1979, an honour only previously held by Otto Klemperer.

Live Music Now

In 1977 Yehudi Menuhin asked his friend, Ian Stoutzker, if he would realise a dream close to his heart. The scheme was to be called Live Music Now. Menuhin’s experiences during the Second World War playing to the sick and the wounded together with his desire to help talented young musicians had given him the idea of creating an organisation that would have a dual purpose. Its aim would be to reach out to those less fortunate in society to enjoy the benefits of live music  and at the same time help young musicians at the start of their careers. 
Ian was Chairman from 1978 until 2019. Getting started was slow. Venues such as children and old peoples’ homes had to be convinced that Live Music Now could bring welfare benefits to offset the disruption of their routines. Most benefactors preferred to support performances in high profile venues. It was a pioneering venture.
Today the scheme embraces the whole of the United Kingdom. An organisation nationwide delivering thousands of interactive music programmes each year in care homes, village halls, homes for children with special needs, special schools and hospitals and also in a range of healthcare settings. Millions have benefited from the scheme since its inception.
The many thousands of musicians that have worked with Live Music Now now have over the years also received support and training which has given them new skills and employment opportunities at the start of their careers. The vast majority of them have remained active and highly successful members of the music profession. They are the best advocates for Live Music Now now having seen for themselves the impact on the lives of the participants.
After forty years as Chairman of Live Music Now Ian has passed on responsibility for the future of the scheme to the very capable hands of Sir Vernon Ellis with Ian as President.

London Symphony Orchestra

Ian was invited to chair the Advisory Council of the London Symphony Orchestra in 1992, He served for fifteen years considerably extending the Council and its activities. He retired in 2007 and was awarded the Orchestra’s highest honour, Honorary Membership of the London Symphony Orchestra.

European Union Youth Orchestra

In 2014 Ian became Co-Chairman of the European Union Youth Orchestra, at a period of major transition, he served in this position until 2020. At a meeting of the Board in December 2020, a resolution was adopted “Sir Ian has used his skills and judgement in maintaining and developing the EUYO’s financial resources, preserving the highest musical standards,  developing creative ties with artistic partners. Sir Ian has been tireless in pursuit of these ends and has always made himself readily available for advice and comment. Knowledgeable, generous, fearless and shrewd in his judgements, Sir Ian’s contribution to the Orchestra’s welfare, even its continuation, cannot be exaggerated. This Board resolution reflects our gratitude. The board welcomes too his continuing involvement in the EUYO through his chairmanship of the EUYO Advisory Council”

Among Other Musical Activities
Co-Chairman - Voices Foundation 1992-2003

Member - Finance Committee of the Musicians Benevolent Fund 1980-2004

Awards
Ian has been the recipient of a number of prestigious awards.

1969 - Fellow of the Royal College of Music

1993 - Order of the British Empire

2006 - Hon. Member of the London Symphony Orchestra 

2008 - Hon. Fellow of the Royal Academy of Music 

2011 - Fellow of the Royal Welsh College of Music and Drama 

2012 - Commander of the British Empire for services to Music

2013 - Prince of Wales Medal for Arts Philanthropy - a joint award with Lady Stoutzker

2017 - Robert Maskrey Award for Arts Philanthropy 

2019 - Knighthood Queen’s Birthday Honours for Services to Music and to Philanthropy

2020 - Hon. Member Royal Society of Musicians of Great Britain

Notable Charitable Donations
These have included:

With his wife Mercedes, a major gift was made of nine important works of British modern art to the Tate Gallery including works by Lucien Freud, David Hockney, Peter Doig and Hurvin Anderson 

A significant gift for the Dora Stoutzker Hall at the Royal Welsh College of Music and Drama, in memory of Ian’s mother, Dora Cohen, who was a music teacher in Tredegar, South Wales.

A major donation contributed to acquire the famous ‘Viotti Stradivari’ violin for the Royal Academy of Music’s Instrument Collection.

End Note
Since 2008 Sir Ian and Lady Stoutzker have been resident in Salzburg, Austria.

References 

Living people
British patrons of music
1929 births
Businesspeople from London
British art collectors
British philanthropists
Commanders of the Order of the British Empire
Knights Bachelor
20th-century British businesspeople